Tony Hannon (born 26 November 1977) is an Irish sportsperson who currently plays Gaelic football for Wicklow Senior Football Championship team Hollywood and was a member of the Wicklow senior team from 1996 to 2012.

References

1977 births
Living people
Wicklow inter-county Gaelic footballers